Wiraqucha (Quechua wira fat, qucha lake, wiraqucha or Wiraqucha mister, sir, gentleman / god / one of the greatest Andean divinities (Wiraqucha) / the eighth emperor of the Tawantinsuyu (Wiraqucha Inka), also spelled Wiracocha) or Wiraquchan (-n is a suffix, Hispanicized Huirajochan) is a mountain in the Andes of Peru, about  high. It is situated in the Cusco Region, Quispicanchi Province, in the districts Andahuaylillas, Huaro and Urcos, south-east of the higher mountain named Quri and north-west of Huaro (Waru). The Willkanuta River flows along the mountain. The lake Quyllur Urmana lies at its feet.

On top of Wiraqucha there is a pair of rocks which resemble two toads, one of them looking at "Apu" Ausangate and the other one looking at "Apu" Pachatusan. This pair, known as Wak'a Los Sapos de Wiraqucha (Spanish los sapos de the toads of), has been considered a wak'a by the local people.

References

Mountains of Peru
Mountains of Cusco Region
Archaeological sites in Peru
Archaeological sites in Cusco Region